Joseph Richard Quigley (born 10 December 1996) is a professional footballer who plays as a forward for Chesterfield. He was previously at AFC Bournemouth, and has played in the English Football League on loan at Gillingham and Newport County.

Club career

AFC Bournemouth
Quigley grew up in Lymington and attended Priestlands School. He joined AFC Bournemouth's academy in 2007 when he was eleven and by 2014, he was on his second year scholarship. On 1 April 2015, Quigley was offered a one-year professional contract.

Quigley signed a contract extensions with the club on two occasions to stay at with them for the next two years, but he was released by Bournemouth at the end of the 2017–18 season.

Loan spells from Bournemouth
On 5 January 2015, while still a second-year scholar, Quigley joined Southern League Premier Division side Poole Town on a one-month youth loan. The following day he made his debut, scoring the second goal in 3–0 victory over Sholing. He then scored his second goal for the club, in a 3–1 win over Chippenham Town on 21 January 2015. His loan spell at Poole Town was soon extended "beyond his initial one-month loan", which was confirmed on 3 February 2015. By March, Quigley scored seven goals in 13 appearances for the side. For his performance, he was awarded for the club's Player of the Season. He went on to make eighteen appearances and score eight goals before returning to Bournemouth.

On 6 August 2015, Quigley joined National League side Torquay United on a one-month loan deal along with fellow Bournemouth academy graduate Josh Carmichael. On 8 August 2015, he made his Torquay United debut in a 1–0 victory over Macclesfield Town, in which he played 58 minutes before being replaced by Malachi Lavelle-Moore. On 22 August 2015, Quigley scored his first goal for Torquay in a 2–2 draw with Grimsby Town. On 23 September 2015, after only scoring once in ten league games, Torquay decided to not extend the loan spell.

On 1 October 2015, Quigley joined National League side Wrexham on a one-month loan deal. Two days later, on 3 October 2015, he made his debut in a 3–2 defeat to Chester, playing 70 minutes before getting replaced by Mark Carrington. On 6 October 2015, Quigley scored his first goal for the Dragons in a 2–2 draw against Tranmere Rovers, in which he played 28 minutes after replacing Mark Carrington. Despite making an impression for the side, Quigley returned to his parent club after spending one month at Wrexham, where he made four appearances and scoring once for them.

On 16 November 2015, Quigley joined his third National League side of the 2015–16 campaign, signing for struggling Woking on a one-month loan spell. Five days later, on 21 November 2015, he made his Woking debut in a surprise 2–1 victory over Chester, in which he set up Dan Holman to score. On 24 November 2015, Quigley continued his good start to his Woking career by scoring the fourth goal in a 4–1 victory over Tranmere Rovers. He then scored two goals in two matches between 5 December 2015 and 19 December 2015 against Lincoln City and Gateshead. He did again when he scored two goals in two matches between 2 January 2016 and 9 January 2016 against Aldershot Town and Wrexham. Having not featured since late–March, Quigley remained at the club for the rest of the season, though he returned to the reserve side and went on to make nineteen appearances and scoring five times for the side.

On 7 July 2016, Quigley joined League One side Gillingham on loan until the end of January 2017. On 6 August 2016, Quigley made his Gillingham debut in a 3–1 victory over Southend United, replacing Jay Emmanuel-Thomas with three minutes remaining. On 17 August 2016, it was confirmed that Quigley had suffered an anterior cruciate ligament tear to his knee, therefore he returned to Bournemouth. Five months later, on 31 January 2017, Quigley re-joined Gillingham on a loan deal for the remainder of the 2016–17 campaign. On 25 February 2017, Quigley made his first appearance since his long-term injury, in Gillingham's 2–1 home victory over Southend United, featuring for the full 90 minutes. On 8 April 2017, Quigley scored his first goal for Gillingham, netting in their 1–1 draw with Millwall. He went on to make eleven appearances and scoring once in all competitions.

On 18 August 2017, Quigley joined Newport County on loan until January 2018. He made his debut in the starting line up the following day in a 1–0 win over Coventry City. However, his time at Newport County saw him struggling in the first team and spent until the end of the year, fighting for his place. Having made five appearances for Newport County by January, he returned to his parent club.

On 9 January 2018, Quigley returned to the National League, to join Boreham Wood on loan for the remainder of the campaign. On the same day, he made his debut during their 3–2 away victory over Dagenham & Redbridge, featuring for 80 minutes before being replaced by Shaun Jeffers. He then scored his first goal for Boreham Wood on 27 January 2018, in a 3–0 win over Ebbsfleet United. For the rest of the season, Quigley found himself, fighting for his first team place at the club. Despite this, he appeared as a substitute in number of matches in the play–offs but lost 2–1 in the play-offs final against Tranmere Rovers on 12 May 2018. Although the club was unsuccessful in the play-offs, Quigley went on to make twelve appearances and scoring once in all competitions.

Maidstone United
After being released by Bournemouth, Quigley went on to sign a one-year deal with National League side Maidstone United for the 2018–19 campaign.

Quigley made his Maidstone United debut on 4 August 2018, where he started the match, in a 1–1 draw against Hartlepool United. In a follow up match three days later against Dagenham & Redbridge, he played a vital role when he set up two goals for Blair Turgott, who scored twice, in a 2–1 win.

Bromley
Following the appointment of Harry Wheeler, Quigley was in turn transfer listed and left Maidstone a month later to join Bromley until the end of the campaign. He played just six times for the Ravens and was loaned out to Eastbourne Borough and Havant & Waterlooville. He was released at the end of the season.

Dagenham & Redbridge
In July 2019, Quigley joined Dagenham & Redbridge on a two-year deal.

Yeovil Town
On 13 October 2020, after cancelling his contract with Dagenham & Redbridge Quigley joined fellow National League side Yeovil Town on a contract until the end of the 2020–21 season.

Chesterfield
On 21 January 2022, Quigley signed a two-and-a-half year contract with fellow National League side Chesterfield for an undisclosed fee.

International career
Quigley is eligible to play for Republic of Ireland through his grandfather.

On 15 March 2017, Quigley received his first international call-up for the Republic of Ireland U21 squad by manager Noel King for their fixture against Kosovo U21, but remained as an unused sub in their 1–0 victory. On 5 September 2017, Quigley made his international debut for Ireland during their 2019 UEFA European Under-21 Championship qualification fixture against Azerbaijan, replacing Reece Grego-Cox in the 3–1 victory.

Career statistics

References

External links

1996 births
Living people
People from Hayes, Bromley
English footballers
Association football forwards
Republic of Ireland youth international footballers
AFC Bournemouth players
Poole Town F.C. players
Torquay United F.C. players
Wrexham A.F.C. players
Woking F.C. players
Gillingham F.C. players
Newport County A.F.C. players
Boreham Wood F.C. players
Maidstone United F.C. players
Bromley F.C. players
Eastbourne Borough F.C. players
Havant & Waterlooville F.C. players
Dagenham & Redbridge F.C. players
Billericay Town F.C. players
Yeovil Town F.C. players
Chesterfield F.C. players
English people of Irish descent
English Football League players
National League (English football) players
Southern Football League players